My First Time is a South Korean television series written by Jung Hyun-jung and directed by Lee Jung-hyo. It starred Choi Min-ho, Park So-dam, Kim Min-jae, Jung Yoo-jin, Lee Yi-kyung and Cho Hye-jung. It is the first drama produced by OnStyle network and it started airing on October 7, 2015 every Wednesday 23:00 (KST) for eight episodes. The series centers around six young people who gather on the rooftop of Tae-oh's house as their hideout. They each have their own story.

In 2019, the series was rebooted on Netflix under the title My First First Love.

Cast

Main cast
Choi Min-ho as Yoon Tae-oh
Park So-dam as Han Song-yi
Kim Min-jae as Seo Ji-an
Jung Yoo-jin as Ryoo Se-hyun
Lee Yi-kyung as Choi Hoon
Cho Hye-jung as Oh Ga-rin

Supporting cast
Ahn Nae-sang as Tae-o's father
Jeong Man-sik as Ji-an's father
Ahn Woo-yeon
Lee Doo-suk 
Lee Se-wook 
Jang Hae-song

Cameo appearances
Im Yoon-ah as Im Yoon-ah (Yoon Tae-oh's senior) (episode 1)
Hong Seok-cheon as cafe manager (episode 1)
Lee Seung-yeon as Song-Yi's aunt (episode 1)
Yang Hee-kyung as Counselor (episode 1)
Jung Kyung-ho as Policeman (episode 2)
Yoon Hyun-min as Policeman (episode 2)

Notes
This is the first drama series produced by OnStyle.
"My First Time" drama surpassed 300 million views online.

Original soundtracks

Awards and nominations

References

External links
  
 
 

Korean-language television shows
2015 South Korean television series debuts
South Korean romantic comedy television series
South Korean drama web series
OnStyle original programming
Television series by AStory